US Concarneau is a French football club based in Concarneau (Finistère). It was founded in 1911. They play at the Stade Guy Piriou, named in honour of the former club president, which has a capacity of 7,000. The colours of the club are red and blue.

Since 2017–18 season the club plays in the Championnat National.

Honours
 Brittany DH championship: 2000
 West DH championship: 1969

Current squad

References

External links
  
US Concarneau club profile at foot-national.com
US Concarneau club information at FFF.fr

Association football clubs established in 1911
1911 establishments in France
Concarneau
Sport in Finistère
Football clubs in Brittany